Jim Burke may refer to:
Jim Burke (author) (born 1961), American author
Jim Burke (cricketer) (1930–1979), Australian cricketer
Jim Burke (illustrator) (born 1973), American illustrator
Jim Burke (c. 1956–1994), the real name of the prolific letter column contributor T. M. Maple
Mr. B The Gentleman Rhymer (Jim Burke), British parodist and rapper
Jim Burke (film producer), American film producer who frequently collaborates with Alexander Payne and Jim Taylor

See also
James Burke (disambiguation)
Jimmy Burke (disambiguation)